Jones Falls Area is a neighborhood in north Baltimore, Maryland.

References

Neighborhoods in Baltimore